Castleford Tigers are an English professional rugby league club based in Castleford, West Yorkshire. The club has competed in the sport since joining the Rugby Football League in 1926. This list details the club's achievements in all major competitions.

Seasons

Super League era

Notes

Bibliography
 
 

 
Castleford Tigers
British rugby league lists